Musa chunii is a species of wild banana (genus Musa), native from Arunachal Pradesh to western Yunnan in China. It is placed in section Musa (now including the former section Rhodochlamys), having a diploid chromosome number of 2n = 20.

References

chunii
Flora of Arunachal Pradesh
Flora of Yunnan